Noel Connelly (born 1972) is an Irish former Gaelic football manager and player.

Career
He played as a midfielder at senior level for the Mayo county team before later serving as joint-manager of the team with Pat Holmes from 2014 until 2015.
Connelly along with Pat Holmes left as joint managers of the Mayo team in 2015 after one year due to a player revolt and the threat of a strike by the team if they remained in charge.

Honours

Player
 Hollymount-Carramore
 Mayo Senior Football Championship (3): 1990, 1991, 1994

 Mayo
 Connacht Senior Football Championship (3): 1996, 1997, 1999
 National Football League (1): 2000-01

Manager
 Mayo
 Connacht Senior Football Championship (1): 2015
 All-Ireland Under-21 Football Championship (1): 2006

References

 

1972 births
Living people
Gaelic football managers
Mayo inter-county Gaelic footballers